Jomol (born 1 January 1981), also known as Gauri is an Indian actress, known for her work in Malayalam cinema. She won the Kerala State Film Award for Best Actress and National Film Award - Special Mention for her role in Ennu Swantham Janakikutty (1996).

Early life

Gauri Chandrashekar Pillai was born as Jomol John to K. A. John and Alphonsa at Kodenchery in Kozhikode district. Her father was an entrepreneur and her mother was a nurse in Saudi Arabia.

Career
She is an Indian actress who appeared in Malayalam films. She has had major roles in films like Niram, Piriyadha Varam Vendum and Deepasthambham Mahascharyam. In 1997, she won the Kerala State Film Award for best actress for her role in Ennu Swantham Janakikutty and also a special jury mention from the National Film Awards.

Personal life
Jomol married Chandrashekar Pillai in 2002, after converting to Hinduism and changed her name to Gauri Chandrashekar Pillai. The couple have 2 daughters.

Awards

National Film Awards
 1997: Special jury Mention - Ennu Swantham Janakikutty
Kerala State Film Awards
 1997: Best Actress - Ennu Swantham Janakikutty
Kerala Film Critics Awards
 1997: Best Actress - Ennu Swantham Janakikutty

Filmography

Films

Television 

Other shows as Guest
 Onnum Onnum Moonu
 JB Junction
 Varthakkappuram
 Jomolude Suvisheshangal
 Vanitha
 Thiranottam
 Katha Ithuvare
 Chat with Jomol
 I Personally
 Veettamma
 Comedy Super Nite

Performances
 Alukkas Fairy Tale

References

External links

Jomol at MSI

1982 births
Living people
Actresses from Kozhikode
Actresses in Malayalam cinema
Indian film actresses
Actresses in Tamil cinema
Kerala State Film Award winners
Converts to Hinduism from Catholicism
Indian former Christians
20th-century Indian actresses
21st-century Indian actresses
Indian television actresses
Actresses in Malayalam television
Indian Hindus
Special Mention (feature film) National Film Award winners